Unicorn Chan  (1940–1987) was a Hong Kong actor, martial artist, stuntman and one of Bruce Lee's best friends since childhood. He acted in many films during childhood including The Birth of Mankind (1946) in which Bruce Lee starred.

Background
After Lee left for the States, Chan acted in Hong Kong films in supporting and minor roles. After Lee returned to Hong Kong, Chan was cast in Fist of Fury (1972) and Way of the Dragon (1972).

Unicorn Chan died in Kuala Lumpur, Malaysia on 31 March 1987 from a car crash.

He was portrayed by Jin Au-Yeung in Bruce Lee, My Brother (2010) which is based on Bruce Lee's early life.

Filmography

Films 
This is a partial list of films.
 1946 The Birth of Mankind 
 1951 Emei fei xia wu chuang feng huo dao 
 1951 Hua Mu Lan 
 Fu zhi guo (1951) – Juvenile
 Fo qian deng zhao zhuang yuan hong (1953)
 Bai gu li hun zhen xia ji (1964) – Cat man
 1964 North meets South 
 1965 Bao lian deng 
 1965 Hei mei gui – Rascal
 1965 Yuan yang jian xia 
 1966 Spy with My Face – Gang member.
 1966 Da zui xia 
 1966 Jin pu sa 
 1966 Jin ding you long 
 1966 Bian cheng san xia 
 Guan shi yin (1967)
 Na ge shao nu bu duo qing (1967)
 Sha shou fen hong zuan (1967)
 Guai xia (1968)
 Wei xian shi qi sui (1968)
 Tie guan yin yong po bao zha dang (1968)
 Xiao mian xia (1968)
 That Fiery Girl (1968)
 Ai ta xiang ta hen ta (1968) – Nightclub Teddy boy
 Qing chun lian ge (1968)
 Duan hun gu (1968)
 Yu luo cha (1968)
 Die hai hua (1968)
 Qi cai nan xiong nan di (1968)
 Killer Darts (1968)
 Hao xia zhuan (1969)
 Leng nuan qing chun (1969)
 Two Sisters Who Steal (1969) – Toby Ho
 Shaolin Drunk Fighter (1969)
 Huan le kan sheng man hua tang (1969)
 Si wu shi (1969) – Wang Qihu
 Jian dan (1969)
 Hong deng lu deng (1969) – Fighter
 Tiger's Courage (1969)
 A Big Mess (1969)
 Long men jin jian (1969) – Black Demon guard
 Fei nan fei nu (1969)
 The Eagle's Claw (1970) – Yin's fighter
 Brothers Five (1970) – Bandit Elder Wang
 Shen jian you long (1970)
 Forbidden Killing (1970)
 Dang nu chi nan (1970)
 Zuo ri jin ri ming ri (1970)
 Shi wang zhi wang (1971)
 Xue zhao (1971)
 Lang zi zhi ge (1971)
 Gui tai jian (1971)
 Duel for Gold (1971) – Wen's assistant
 Xue fu men (1971)
 Chao piao yu wo (1971)
 Xiao shi yi lang (1971)
 Ba shi zhan (1971)
 Fist of Fury (1972) – Jing Wu student (uncredited)
 Finger of Doom (1972)
 Love and Blood (1972)
 Way of the Dragon (1972) – Jimmy
 The Devil's Mirror (1972) – Ambush innkeeper
 Intimate Confessions of a Chinese Courtesan (1972)
 Xue ai (1972)
 Da nei gao shou (1972)
 Qun ying hui (1972)
 The Fugitive (1972)
 Black Tavern (1972) – Three-Headed Cobra 2
 Pi li quan (1972)
 Ambush (1973)
 Fist of Unicorn (1973) – Ah-Lung
 Xue sa hou jie (1973)
 The Blood Hero (1975) – Fist of Unicorn
 Jin mao shi wang (1975)
 Bruce Lee: The Man, The Myth (1976) – Himself
 Deadly Snail vs. Kung Fu Killers (1977)
 Bloody Hero (1977)
 The Fairy, the Ghost and Ah Chung (1979)
 Guang Dong liang zai yu (1982)
 Heng sao yu dan dang (1982)
 Shaolin Drunken Fighter (1983)
 Fury of the Heaven (1986) – (final film role)

References

External links
 
 Hong Kong Cinemagic: Unicorn Chan
 Little Unicorn at hkmdb.com

1946 births
1987 deaths
20th-century Hong Kong male actors
Hong Kong Buddhists
Hong Kong male film actors
Road incident deaths in Malaysia